Ukrainian National Army (UNA) was a World War II Ukrainian military group, created on March 17, 1945 in the town of Weimar, Nazi Germany, and subordinate to Ukrainian National Committee.

The army, formed on April 15, 1945, and commanded by General Pavlo Shandruk,  consisted of the following units:
 1. Renamed 14th Waffen Grenadier Division of the SS Galizien (1st Ukrainian) (However, there is no proof to demonstrate that the renaming was done formally)
 2. UNA Division being organized into two brigades – the Anti-Tank Brigade Вільна Україна ("Free Ukraine") and a second brigade – from remnants of the Ukrainian Liberation Army and other Ukrainian units, led by General Petro Dyachenko;
 special Gruppe B (50 men) led by General Taras Bulba-Borovets;
 Ukrainian Free Cossacks led by Colonel Tereshchenko;
 1. Reserve Brigade led by Colonel Hudyma;
 2. Reserve Brigade led by Colonel Malets.

Plans were made regarding the inclusion of the Ukrainian Liberation Army, Kuban Cossacks and Georgian military divisions.

The primary purpose of creation of the Ukrainian National Army was to integrate all the Ukrainian units fighting the Soviets under a single command. The intended size of the army, encompassing all the Ukrainian units subordinate to Oberkommando des Heeres was 220,000. However within the two months left till the end of the war, Shandruk was able to gather about 50,000 soldiers.

In reality, Shandruk was able to command only the 1. UNA Division and elements of the 2. UNA Division. On May 7, under his influence, the division – located in western Austria by this time, after slowly moving from Slovenia (February 1945) – withdrew further from Red Army forces. The Army now split into several groups, with one heading towards the Italian border and surrendering to the British Army's 15th Army Group, while others moved toward the German and Swiss borders and surrendered to the US Army's 6th Army Group. The UNA soldiers were interned in northern Italy, in the area controlled by Polish II Corps forces. After the capitulation, Shandruk asked for a meeting with Polish general Władysław Anders in London, and asked him to protect the army against the deportation to Soviet Union. Despite the Soviet pressure, Anders managed to protect Ukrainian soldiers as the former citizens of the Second Republic of Poland. Shandruk and the bulk of his forces managed to remain in the West, with many of the former UNA soldiers joining the French Foreign Legion.

Other groups, splintered, either surrendered to the Soviet or the Western Allies, facing repatriation, with several hundred interned in Switzerland.

The UNA had a bad relationship with general Andrei Vlasov's Russian Liberation Army (KONR) and was never subordinated to it.

References

Further reading 

Military units and formations of World War II
Military history of Ukraine
Organization of Ukrainian Nationalists
Military units and formations established in 1945
Ukrainian collaborators with Nazi Germany
Institutions with the title of National in Ukraine